The 1911 Ohio Green and White football team represented Ohio University as an independent during the 1911 college football season. Led by first-year head coach Arthur Hinaman, the Green and White compiled a record of 3–3–2.

Schedule

References

Ohio
Ohio Bobcats football seasons
Ohio Green and White football